Bayfield may refer to:

Boats
 Bayfield 25, a Canadian sailboat design built in Bayfield Ontario.

People
Bayfield (surname)

Places
in the United States:
Bayfield, Colorado, a town
Bayfield, Indiana, an unincorporated community
Bayfield, Missouri, a ghost town
Bayfield, Wisconsin, a city
Bayfield County, Wisconsin
Bayfield (town), Wisconsin
in Canada:
Bayfield, New Brunswick, an unincorporated community
Bayfield, Nova Scotia, a village
Bayfield, Ontario, a village
Bayfield River in Ontario
in New Zealand:
Bayfield High School, Dunedin
Bayfield, Barbados, village

Geology 
 Bayfield group, sandstone found in Wisconsin